Mary Grace O'Brien (born 1958) is a Judge of the Virginia Court of Appeals.

Life and education

O'Brien was born in 1958 in Buffalo, New York. She received her Bachelor of Arts from Le Moyne College and her Juris Doctor from Washington and Lee University School of Law.

Legal career

She clerked for the Honorable Roscoe B. Stephenson Jr. of the Supreme Court of Virginia for two years. Then Prince William County Commonwealth’s Attorney Paul Ebert hired her in 1985. In 2001, she was elevated to the Juvenile and Domestic Relations District Court for PWC, and in 2008, she was elevated to be the first female Circuit Court Judge in the 31st Judicial Circuit.

Service on Virginia Court of Appeals

She was elected by the General Assembly on January 22, 2015, to an eight-year term beginning February 1, 2015. On June 15, 2015 she was invested as the 37th Judge of the Court of Appeals of Virginia. Her current term expires in on January 31, 2023.

References

External links

Living people
1958 births
20th-century American lawyers
21st-century American judges
Judges of the Court of Appeals of Virginia
Le Moyne College alumni
People from Buffalo, New York
Washington and Lee University School of Law alumni
20th-century American women lawyers
21st-century American women judges